Corias is one of fifteen parishes (administrative divisions) in Pravia, a municipality within the province and autonomous community of Asturias, in northern Spain.

The population is 232 (INE 2007).

Villages and hamlets
 Corias (Courias)
 Las Campas
 Luerces (Lluercis)
 Palla
 Repollés (Repollis)
 Vegañán (Veigañán)
 Villanueva

References

Parishes in Pravia